Amazon Mayoruna is an extinct indigenous once spoken along the Amazon River, on the borders of Brazil, Peru, and Colombia. There were two dialects, known only as the dialects of the "wild" Mayoruna and the "settled" Mayoruna (Fleck 2013).

References

Indigenous languages of Western Amazonia
Panoan languages
Extinct languages of South America